The Kings-Kaweah Divide is a divide in Sequoia National Park. It splits the watersheds of the Kaweah Rivers and the Kings River, .

The Divide's extent

The Divide runs from (west to east) from Big Baldy west of Mount Silliman east to Triple Divide Peak, which is part of the Great Western Divide.

The Divide is a border

The Divide forms the northern border between Sequoia and Kings Canyon National Parks, .

Summits and passes on the Divide

Going west to east, Mount Silliman is a prominent summit, as are Elizabeth Peak and Alta Peak, and the Divide terminates at Triple Divide Peak, .

Both Elizabeth Pass and Copper Mine Pass are directly on the Divide, as is Silliman Pass.

It also runs along Copper Mine Pass, and is near Cloud Canyon and Upper Big Bird Lake.

External links
A map
Nearby mountains
A description of hiking the Kings-Kaweah Divide
More hiking
Some photos
More photos

Sequoia National Park